Teyf, Teif, sometimes Taif, Tayf, is a surname. Notable people with the surname include:

Leonid Teyf, Russian-Israeli businessman and accused white-collar criminal
Moisei Teif (1904-1966), Yiddish-language Soviet Jewish poet

Hebrew-language surnames